Hesperophymatus is a genus of beetles in the family Cerambycidae, containing the following species:

 Hesperophymatus chydaeus Martins & Monné, 1975
 Hesperophymatus limexylon Zajciw, 1959

References

Hesperophanini